Stonestreet: Who Killed the Centerfold Model? is a 1977 American made-for-television mystery-crime drama film starring Barbara Eden, directed by Russ Mayberry from a teleplay written by Leslie Stevens and produced as a pilot for a proposed television series that was not picked up by the network. The film originally premiered as the NBC Movie of the Week on January 16, 1977.

Plot summary
Liz Stonestreet (Barbara Eden) is a private investigator and former policewoman whose late husband, a police detective, was killed in the line of duty and she becomes a detective to keep his beliefs about law and order alive.

Stonestreet is hired by Mrs. Shroeder (Louise Latham) to locate her son, Eddie (James Ingersoli), a small-time hoodlum who has been missing for eight days. Liz goes undercover as an usher at a porno theatre where Eddie worked and discovers in his locker a pair of expensive diamond earrings and newspaper clippings about a missing heiress, Amory Osborn (Ann Dusenberry), the niece of Elliott Osborn (Richard Basehart), a rich and powerful business leader. Despite advice from her boss Max Pierce (Joseph Mascolo) that her  suspicions are unfounded, Stonestreet pursues the investigation in an attempt to find the link between Shroeder and the heiress.

Cast
Barbara Eden as Liz Stonestreet
Joseph Mascolo as Max Pierce
Joan Hackett as Jessica Hilliard
Richard Basehart as Elliott Osborn
Louise Latham as Mrs. Shroeder
Elaine Giftos as Arlene
Ann Dusenberry as Amory Osborn
James Ingersoll as Eddie Shroeder
Robert Burton as Dale Anderson

Release
Stonestreet: Who Killed the Centerfold Model? has never been released on any format in the United States. The film aired on NBC on January 16, 1977. Stonestreet: Who Killed the Centerfold Model? was released on DVD in region 4.

References

External links

Archive of American Television interview – Barbara Eden discusses the filming of Stonestreet

1977 television films
1977 films
1977 crime drama films
American mystery drama films
American crime drama films
NBC network original films
Films scored by Patrick Williams
Television films as pilots
Television pilots not picked up as a series
Films directed by Russ Mayberry
1970s English-language films
1970s American films